Euryphura isuka, the scarce commander, is a butterfly in the family Nymphalidae. It is found in eastern Nigeria, Cameroon, the Democratic Republic of the Congo, Uganda and western Kenya. The habitat consists of forests.

References

Butterflies described in 1935
Limenitidinae